Golab-e Bala (also Romanized as Golāb-e Bālā; also known as Golāb) is a village in Momenabad Rural District, in the Central District of Sarbisheh County, South Khorasan Province, Iran. At the 2006 census, its population was 24, in 7 families.

References 

Populated places in Sarbisheh County